A bioassay is an analytical method to determine the concentration or potency of a substance by its effect on living animals or plants (in vivo), or on living cells or tissues(in vitro). A bioassay can be either quantal or quantitative, direct or indirect. If the measured response is binary, the assay is quantal, if not, it is quantitative.

A bioassay may be used to detect biological hazards or to give an assessment of the quality of a mixture. A bioassay is often used to monitor water quality as well as wastewater discharges and its impact on the surroundings. It is also used to assess the environmental impact and safety of new technologies and facilities.

Principle 
A bioassay is a biochemical test to estimate the potency of a sample compound. Usually this potency can only be measured relative to a standard compound. A typical bioassay involves a stimulus (ex. drugs) applied to a subject (ex. animals, tissues, plants). The corresponding response (ex. death) of the subject is thereby triggered and measured.

History 
The first use of a bioassay dates back to as early as the late 19th century, when the foundation of bioassays was laid down by German physician Paul Ehrlich. He introduced the concept of standardization by the reactions of living matter. His bioassay on diphtheria antitoxin was the first bioassay to receive recognition. His use of bioassay was able to discover that administration of gradually increasing dose of diphtheria in animals stimulated production of antiserum.

One well known example of a bioassay is the "canary in the coal mine" experiment. To provide advance warning of dangerous levels of methane in the air, miners would take methane-sensitive canaries into coal mines. If the canary died due to a build-up of methane, the miners would leave the area as quickly as possible.

Many early examples of bioassays used animals to test the  carcinogenicity of chemicals. In 1915, Yamaigiwa Katsusaburo and Koichi Ichikawa tested the carcinogenicity of coal tar using the inner surface of rabbit's ears.

From the 1940s to the 1960s, animal bioassays were primarily used to test the toxicity and safety of drugs, food additives, and pesticides.

Beginning in the late 1960s and 1970s, reliance on bioassays increased as public concern for occupational and environmental hazards increased.

Classifications

Direct assay 
In a direct assay, the stimulus applied to the subject is specific and directly measurable, and the response to that stimulus is recorded. The variable of interest is the specific stimulus required to produce a response of interest (ex. death of the subject).

Indirect assay 
In an indirect assay, the stimulus is fixed in advance and the response is measured in the subjects. The variable of interest in the experiment is the response to a fixed stimulus of interest.
 Quantitative response: The measurement of the response to the stimulus is on a continuous scale (ex. blood sugar content).
 Quantal response: The response is binary; it is a determination of whether or not an event occurs (ex. death of the subject).

Examples

ELISA (Enzyme-linked immunosorbent assay) 

ELISA is a quantitative analytical method that measures absorbance of color change from antigen-antibody reaction (ex. Direct, indirect, sandwich, competitive). ELISA is used to measure a variety of substances in the human body, from cortisol levels for stress to glucose level for diabetes.

Home pregnancy test 
Home pregnancy tests use ELISA to detect the increase of human chorionic gonadotropin (hCG) during pregnancy.

HIV test 
HIV tests also use indirect ELISA to detect HIV antibodies caused by infection.

Environmental bioassays
Environmental bioassays are generally a broad-range survey of toxicity. A toxicity identification evaluation is conducted to determine what the relevant toxicants are. Although bioassays are beneficial in determining the biological activity within an organism, they can often be time-consuming and laborious. Organism-specific factors may result in data that are not applicable to others in that species. For these reasons, other biological techniques are often employed, including radioimmunoassays. See bioindicator.

Water pollution control requirements in the United States require some industrial dischargers and municipal sewage treatment plants to conduct bioassays. These procedures, called whole effluent toxicity tests, include acute toxicity tests as well as chronic test methods. The methods involve exposing living aquatic organisms to samples of wastewater for a specific length of time. Another example is the bioassay ECOTOX, which uses the microalgae Euglena gracilis to test the toxicity of water samples. (See Bioindicator#Microalgae as bioindicators and water quality)

See also 
 Assay
 Immunoassay
 Umu Chromotest

References 

Aquatic ecology
Environmental science
Pharmacology
Water pollution